The 2012 Women's Basketball Invitational (WBI) was a single-elimination tournament of 16 National Collegiate Athletic Association (NCAA) Division I teams that did not participate in the 2012 NCAA Division I women's basketball tournament or 2012 Women's National Invitation Tournament. The 2012 bracket was announced on March 13, 2012. All games were hosted by the higher seed throughout the tournament, unless the higher seed's arena was unavailable. The championship game was hosted by the school with the higher end of the season RPI. The tournament was won by the Minnesota Golden Gophers.

2012 Teams
Seattle will be making its first division I postseason appearance,  SIU Edwardsville will host its first ever division I postseason game.

West Region

East Region
#8 Manhattan will host a first round game

WBI Championship Game

See also
 2012 NCAA Men's Division I Basketball Tournament
 2012 NCAA Women's Division I Basketball Tournament
 NCAA Women's Division I Tournament bids by school
 2012 Women's National Invitation Tournament

References 

Women's Basketball Invitational
Women's Basketball Invitational